The Ministry of Foreign Affairs and Emigrants is the Lebanese government ministry in charge of the country's foreign affairs and maintaining relations with its large emigrant communities.

List of ministers

External links
Ministry of Foreign Affairs and Emigrants Official website
General Directorate of Emigrants Official website
List of ministers at Rulers.org

Foreign affairs
Lebanon